, since 2018 renamed "Empress's Cup JFA Japan Women's Football Championship" or The Empress's Cup, is a Japanese Women's football competition. As an elimination tournament, it can be considered the female counterpart to the men's Emperor's Cup. The name "Empress's Cup" has been used since the 2012 season as the Empress's Cup trophy was founded in that year.

From 2004 to 2011 season (New Year's Day of 2005 to 2012), the final was played on New Year's Day at the National Olympic Stadium in Tokyo before the Emperor's Cup final, and was regarded as the traditional closing match of the season. Since 2012, the final has been played separately from the Emperor's Cup final.

Past winners
Past winners are:

See also

 Football in Japan
 Women's football in Japan
 Japan Football Association (JFA)

 Japanese association football league system
 WE League (I)
 Nadeshiko League
 Nadeshiko League Division 1 (II)
 Nadeshiko League Division 2 (III)
 Regional Leagues (IV)
 Empress's Cup (National Cup)
 Nadeshiko League Cup (League Cup)

References

External links
 Official website, JFA.jp 

 
Japan
Women's football competitions in Japan
Football cup competitions in Japan